Chmielowski (feminine: Chmielowska, plural: Chmielowscy) is a Polish surname. Notable people with the surname include:

Albert Chmielowski (1845–1916), Polish Catholic saint
Benedykt Chmielowski (1700–1753), Polish priest
Piotr Chmielowski (1848–1904), Polish philosopher and literary historian

See also
Chmielewski, Polish surname

Polish-language surnames